The 1997–98 New Jersey Devils season was the 24th season for the National Hockey League franchise that was established on June 11, 1974, and 16th season since the franchise relocated from Colorado prior to the 1982–83 NHL season. The Devils won the Atlantic Division title, but were eliminated in the first round of the 1998 Stanley Cup playoffs by the Ottawa Senators.

Regular season
The Devils once again led the NHL in defense, allowing a League-low 166 goals in the 82-game regular season. Although the Devils had the fewest power play opportunities in the League, with just 333, they finished second in power play percentage, with 18.92% (63 for 333).

Final standings

Schedule and results

Playoffs

Eastern Conference quarterfinals

(1) New Jersey Devils vs. (8) Ottawa Senators

The first two games were played at the Meadowlands. In Game 1, Ottawa won 2–1 in overtime, but in Game 2, the Devils were victorious by a score of 3–1. Games 3 and 4 were played in Ottawa. The Senators won Game 3, 2–1, in overtime and Game 4, 4–3. Game 5 was back in New Jersey, where the Devils won 3–1. Game 6 went back to Ottawa, where the Senators won 3–1 and the series 4–2.

Media
This was the first season of television broadcast coverage on Fox Sports Net New York.

Player statistics

Regular season
Scoring

Goaltending

Playoffs
Scoring

Goaltending

Note: GP = Games played; G = Goals; A = Assists; Pts = Points; +/- = Plus/minus; PIM = Penalty minutes; PPG = Power-play goals; SHG = Short-handed goals; GWG = Game-winning goals
      MIN = Minutes played; W = Wins; L = Losses; T = Ties; GA = Goals against; GAA = Goals against average; SO = Shutouts; SA = Shots against; SV = Shots saved; SV% = Save percentage;

Awards and records

Awards

Nominations

Transactions

Draft picks
Team's picks at the 1997 NHL Entry Draft, held in Pittsburgh, Pennsylvania, at the Civic Arena.

See also
1997–98 NHL season

Notes

References
 

New Jersey Devils seasons
New Jersey Devils
New Jersey Devils
New Jersey Devils
New Jersey Devils
20th century in East Rutherford, New Jersey
Meadowlands Sports Complex